Anolis monteverde is a species of lizard in the family Dactyloidae.

References

Anoles
Endemic fauna of Costa Rica
Reptiles of Costa Rica
Reptiles described in 2009
Taxa named by Gunther Köhler